Geoffrey Seabury "Geoff" Bruce (born January 26, 1953) is a former World Cup alpine ski racer. He competed in the slalom at the 1976 Winter Olympics, but failed to finish. He had many notable accomplishments in his racing career, including a 4th in the World Cup slalom at Madonna di Campiglio in 1974 and a 5th in the World Cup slalom at Kitzbuehel in 1975. Geoff skied for the Holderness School and was a member of the national team from 1974–78. In 1974–75, he placed 28th overall in the FIS Alpine Ski World Cup.

References

1953 births
Living people
American male alpine skiers
Olympic alpine skiers of the United States
Alpine skiers at the 1976 Winter Olympics
People from Corning, New York